Magel is a Dutch surname. Notable people with the surname include:

 Charles R. Magel (1920–2014), American philosopher, animal rights activist and bibliographer

See also 
 Nagel

References 

Dutch-language surnames